National Tertiary Route 325, or just Route 325 (or ) is a National Road Route of Costa Rica, located in the San José province.

Description
In San José province the route covers Pérez Zeledón canton (San Isidro de El General, Páramo districts).

References

Highways in Costa Rica